The 2003 Prix de l'Arc de Triomphe was a horse race held at Longchamp on Sunday 5 October 2003. It was the 82nd running of the Prix de l'Arc de Triomphe.

The winner was Dalakhani, a three-year-old colt trained in France by Alain de Royer-Dupré. The winning jockey was Christophe Soumillon.

Race details
 Sponsor: Groupe Lucien Barrière
 Purse: €1,600,000; First prize: €914,240 
 Going: Holding
 Distance: 2,400 metres
 Number of runners: 13
 Winner's time: 2m 32.3s

Full result

 Abbreviation: nk = neck

Winner's details
Further details of the winner, Dalakhani.
 Sex: Colt
 Foaled: 16 February 2000
 Country: Ireland
 Sire: Darshaan; Dam: Daltawa (Miswaki)
 Owner / Breeder: HH Aga Khan IV

References

External links
 Colour Chart – Arc 2003

Prix de l'Arc de Triomphe
 2003
Prix de l'Arc de Triomphe
Prix de l'Arc de Triomphe
Prix de l'Arc de Triomphe